The Freedom Football Conference (FFC) was a college athletic conference that competed in the NCAA's Division III.  Member teams were located in New England and New York. It was formed in 1992 and disbanded after the 2003 season. As can be deduced from the conference's name, teams competed within the FFC in football only.  The teams competed in other conferences in other sports.

Members
Norwich University (Now in the Eastern Collegiate Football Conference for football only)
Plymouth State College (Now in the New England Football Conference for football only)
Springfield College (Now in the Liberty League for football only)
United States Coast Guard Academy (Now in the New England Football Conference for football only)
United States Merchant Marine Academy (Now in the Liberty League for football only)
Western Connecticut State University (Now in the New Jersey Athletic Conference for football only)
Worcester Polytechnic Institute (Now in the Liberty League for football only)

Conference champions

See also
 List of defunct college football conferences

References